Take a Chance is the second album by Irish band Stockton's Wing. It features songwriter Mike Hanrahan on vocals.  Mike's own compositions featured on the album were the start of the group's move away from the pure traditional music to a more contemporary style which later became their trademark.  Maura O'Connell is also featured on backing vocals.

Track listing
 My Darling Asleep, Sonny Brogans - Jigs
 Boys of the Lough, Star of Munster - Reels
 Cameron Highlander's
 Take a Chance - Song
 Bill Harte's, Going to the Well for Water - Jig & Slide
 Fiddler John - Song
 The Frost Is All Over, Queen of the Rushes - Jigs
 The Post Man - Bodhrán solo
 Ten Thousand Miles - Song
 Austin Tierneys, Hughie Travers, Jenny's Chickens - Reels & Jigs

Musicians
Mike Hanrahan : Guitar and Vocals
Tommy Hayes : Bodhran, Jew's Harp, Bones, Spoons
Paul Roche : Flute, Whistle, Low Whistle, Vocals
Maurice Lennon : Fiddle, Viola, Vocals
Kieran Hanrahan : Banjo, Mandolin, Bouzouki, Guitar, Harmonica
Additional Musicians include:
Tony Callanan on guitar, Maura O'Connell on backing vocals and Philip Begley on Piano.

References
Record Label Catalogue 2009
Album Sleevenotes

1980 albums
Stockton's Wing albums